Horatia may refer to:
The Roman gens Horatia, and female members of that gens
One of the thirty-five Servian tribes of ancient Rome
Horatia (snail), a genus of freshwater and brackish water snails in the family Hydrobiidae
A scientific term, e.g. Cotinusa horatia
Horatia (given name)